We Are Three is the second studio album by English dance music group Joi, released on 15 October 2000 by Real World Records.

Background
Two months before his death, Haroon visited Bangladesh for a month and made a series of field recordings which Farook used as the basis for We Are Three.

Critical response

Philip Van Vleck of Billboard called We Are Three "...a powerful message from the Asian underground music scene..." Peggy Latkovich of AllMusic rated the album 3/5 and said, "We Are Three shows Farook Shamsher's skill as a manipulator of sounds and serves as worthy testimony to his brother's memory." Vinita Ramani of Exclaim! said, "We Are Three's strength is the story that fuels the album's conception, a story whose mood infuse the entirety of this album."

Track listing

Personnel
Khutub Uddin – flute
Panna Dash – lute
Mohamed Washin – tabla
Mads Bjerke – recording engineer

References

External links

2000 albums
Real World Records albums
Joi (band) albums
Albums produced by Farook Shamsher